Delma grayii, also known as side-barred delma or Gray's legless lizard, is a species of lizard in the Pygopodidae family endemic to Australia.

References

Pygopodids of Australia
Delma
Reptiles described in 1849
Endemic fauna of Australia